Gobioninae is a monophyletic subfamily of Eurasian cyprinid fishes. A species-rich subfamily, it is divided into five tribes: Gobionini, Pseudogobionini, Hemibarbini, Coreiini, and Sarcocheilichthyini.

To adapt to different masticatory operations, members of the Gobioninae developed various types of pharyngeal bones and teeth; some have intermediate pharyngeal bones with rows of diverse teeth (conical,  compressed, and coarsely compressed), others have broad pharyngeal bones with a single row of molar teeth. Some Gobioninae have narrow pharyngeal bones with a row of extremely compressed teeth.

Genera
These genera are included in the subfamily Gobioninae according to Fishbase:

 Abbottina
 Acanthogobio
 Belligobio
 Biwia
 Coreius
 Coreoleuciscus
 Gnathopogon
 Gobio
 Gobiobotia
 Gobiocypris
 Hemibarbus
 Huigobio
 Ladislavia
 Mesogobio
 Microphysogobio
 Paracanthobrama
 Paraleucogobio
 Parasqualidus
 Platysmacheilus
 Pseudogobio
 Pseudopungtungia
 Pseudorasbora
 Pungtungia
 Rhinogobio
 Romanogobio
 Sarcocheilichthys
 Saurogobio
 Squalidus
 Xenophysogobio

References

 
Taxa named by Pieter Bleeker